In music, an instrumental solo piece (from the Italian: solo, meaning alone) is a composition, like an étude, solo sonata, partita, solo suite or impromptus, or an arrangement, written to be played by a single performer. The performer is a soloist.

The instrumental solo pieces can be monophonic or polyphonic. There are monophonic instruments, like those of the brass and wind sections, that can only produce single notes at one time, and polyphonic instruments, like the guitar and piano, that have the option of also playing with polyphony, which is when notes are played simultaneously.

References

 David Fuller, "Solo", The New Grove Dictionary of Music and Musicians, second edition, edited by Stanley Sadie and John Tyrrell (London: Macmillan Publishers, 2001).

Instrumental solo pieces
Solo music